See Alderney for the gannet colony Les Étacs, popularly called Gannet Rock
Gannet Rock, also known as Horuhoru, is an uninhabited rocky islet lying in the Hauraki Gulf, about 1.5 km north of the north-eastern end of Waiheke Island, New Zealand.  It has been identified as an Important Bird Area by BirdLife International because it is a nesting site for about 2500 pairs of Australasian gannets.

See also

 List of islands of New Zealand
 List of islands
 Desert island

References

Uninhabited islands of New Zealand
Islands of the Hauraki Gulf
Important Bird Areas of New Zealand
Islands of the Auckland Region